95th State House District may refer to:

 Georgia's 95th House district
 Michigan's 95th House of Representatives district
 Pennsylvania House of Representatives, District 95
 Virginia's 95th House of Delegates district